Vladimir Ivanovich Kuzyutkin (20 February 1947 – 10 June 2022) was a Soviet and Russian volleyball coach, who from 2009 to 2011 worked as head coach of the Russia women's national volleyball team and helped his team to win the 2010 World Cup. In 2011 he was named an Honored Coach of Russia. From February to November 2014 he coached the Bulgaria women's national volleyball team.

On 2 February 2017, Kuzyutkin returned as head coach for the Russian women's national team.

Honours

Сlubs
 Emlak Bankası
 Turkish Women's Volleyball League: 1989/90, 1990/91
 Eczacıbaşı VitrA
 Turkish Women's Volleyball League: 1993/94, 1994/95

Russian team
 2010 FIVB Volleyball Women's World Championship: 2010

References

External links
 62-летний дебютант
Vladimir Kuzyutkin: I’m really satisfied for the result and for what we showed on court

1947 births
2022 deaths
Russian volleyball coaches
Sportspeople from Volgograd
Soviet men's volleyball players
Honoured Coaches of Russia
Soviet volleyball coaches